The 2019 Southeastern Conference women's basketball tournament was the postseason women's basketball tournament for the Southeastern Conference held at the Bon Secours Wellness Arena in Greenville, South Carolina, from March 6 through 10, 2019. Mississippi State won its first-ever title to earn an automatic bid to the 2019 NCAA Women's Division I Basketball Tournament.

Seeds

Schedule

Bracket

See also
2019 SEC men's basketball tournament

References

2018–19 Southeastern Conference women's basketball season
SEC women's basketball tournament
Basketball competitions in Greenville, South Carolina
SEC Women's Basketball
College basketball tournaments in South Carolina
Women's sports in South Carolina